A conclave capitulation was a compact or unilateral contract drawn up by the College of Cardinals during a papal conclave to constrain the actions of the pope elected by the conclave. The legal term capitulation more frequently refers to the commitment of a sovereign state to relinquish jurisdiction within its borders over the subjects of a foreign state. Before balloting began, all cardinals present at the conclave would swear to be bound by its provisions if elected pope. Capitulations were used by the College of Cardinals to assert its collective authority and limit papal supremacy, to "make the Church an oligarchy instead of a monarchy." Similar electoral capitulations were used on occasion from the 14th to the 17th centuries in Northern and Central Europe to constrain an elected king, emperor, prince, or bishop.

History
The College had made informal attempts to influence the actions of popes before drafting formal capitulations. The first capitulation was drafted in the conclave of 1352, which elected Pope Innocent VI, and most conclaves for the next 300 years produced similar documents.

In 1353, Innocent VI declared these first Capitulations invalid with his Apostolic Constitution, Sollicitudo, citing a Constitution of Pope Gregory X, Contingit, which prohibited papal conclaves from dealing with issues other than the election of a Pope. This papal response would be repeated for most future Capitulations, which were generally disregarded. For this reason, papal historian Frederic Baumgartner calls capitulations "an exercise in futility." Another papal historian, Van Dyke, surmises that by the election of Pope Sixtus IV (1471), "all the Popes for forty years had signed and promptly broken" the "Capitulation of the Conclave." Jugie considers the "regular recourse to capitulation" to be "above all, an admission of weakness."  Despite their ineffectiveness, Capitulations still give an insight into the thinking of the Cardinals as they prepared to vote for a pope.

Although not the last Capitulations, that of the conclave of 1513 (which elected Pope Leo X) was a turning point for papal supremacy and attempts to control it through formal treaties; never again did the College attempt to limit its size through capitulations; although individual cardinals remained powerful, the College as a whole never regained its power as the "senate" of the Church.

In 1676, Pope-elect Innocent XI made the College swear to the capitulation that had been drafted by the previous conclave before accepting his election.

Though the practice was defunct, Pope John Paul II's 1996 Constitution Universi Dominici Gregis banned conclave capitulations as well as the papal veto, which had already been eliminated by Pius X. He wrote: "I likewise forbid the Cardinals before the election to enter into any stipulations, committing themselves of common accord to a certain course of action should one of them be elevated to the Pontificate. These promises too, should any in fact be made, even under oath, I also declare null and void."

List of conclave capitulations

References

Sources
Baumgartner, Frederic J. 2003. Behind Locked Doors: A History of the Papal Elections. Palgrave Macmillan. .
Levillain, Philippe, ed. 2002. The Papacy: An Encyclopedia. Routledge. .
Pastor, Ludwig. 1908. The History of the Popes. K. Paul, Trench, Trübner & Co., Ltd.
Setton, Kenneth Meyer. 1984. The Papacy and the Levant, 1204-1571: The 13th & 14th Centuries. DIANE. .
Van Dyke, Paul. 1897. The Age of the Renascence. The Christian Literature Co.
Walsh, Michael. 2003. The Conclave: A Sometimes Secret and Occasionally Bloody History of Papal Elections. Rowman & Littlefield. .

Election of the Pope
History of the papacy
Law-related lists
Papal primacy